Bolu may refer to:

 Bolu Province, in Turkey
 Bolu, a city and the administrative center of the province
 Kue bolu or simply bolu, an Indonesian sponge cake
 Bolu Akinyode (born 1994), Nigerian professional footballer
 Bolu (album), an album by Tom Rosenthal

See also
 Bolus (disambiguation)
 Bola (disambiguation)
 Bolo (disambiguation)